Kayseray is a light rail street-tram system operating in the city of Kayseri in Turkey. The tracks and station structures were completed and the line opened in 2009.

History
The project began in January 2006, with a completion target of 1,065 days set. The initial proposal was a reaction to the growing traffic congestion in the central parts of the city, and to reduce this, a mass-transit tram link was planned to cut right across the area, allowing transportation of locals from one part of the region to the other.

When opened the initial length of the track was some 17 km, with a total of 28 stations (averaging a distance of 65m/each). Total journey time between each end of the line was expected to be in the region of 45 minutes. 22 trams were planned to be ordered initially.

The line was later extended eastward to İldem and a branch line was opened on 14-02-2014 to Talas via Erciyes Üniversitesi. There are now a total of 55 stations.

The railway uses the same electronic travel card ticketing system as the city's bus transport system. Trains operate between 6:00 in the morning to 24:00 at night seven days a week.

Rolling stock

Current 
All services were initially provided by AnsaldoBreda Sirio trams. The fleet of 22 trams was later expanded to a total of 38.

An order for 30 additional trams from Turkish supplier Bozankaya was placed in August 2014 to augment the existing fleet. The first tram was delivered in March 2016, and all were in service by April 2017.

Former 
Between 2015 and 2017, Gaziantep lent eight Alstom TFS trams (originally used in Rouen) to Kayseray.

Map

References

External links
 Official website of Kayseray (in Turkish)
Bozankaya Tram Technical Specification

Tram transport in Turkey
Kayseri